Isaiah Lewis Green (December 28, 1761 – December 5, 1841) was a U.S. Representative from Massachusetts.

Born in Barnstable in the Province of Massachusetts Bay, Green pursued classical studies, and graduated from Harvard in 1781.
He studied law.
He was admitted to the bar and practiced.

Green was elected as a Democratic-Republican to the Ninth and Tenth Congresses (March 4, 1805 – March 3, 1809).

Green was elected to the Twelfth Congress (March 4, 1811 – March 3, 1813).
He was appointed by President Madison collector of customs for the district of Barnstable, Massachusetts, in 1814 and served until 1837.
He resumed the practice of law.
He died in Cambridge, Massachusetts, on December 5, 1841.
He was interred in the Old Cambridge Cemetery.

References

1761 births
1841 deaths
Harvard University alumni
Burials in Massachusetts
Democratic-Republican Party members of the United States House of Representatives from Massachusetts
People of colonial Massachusetts